Goodbye, Columbus is a 1959 collection of fiction by the American novelist Philip Roth, comprising the title novella "Goodbye, Columbus"—which first appeared in The Paris Review—and five short stories. It was his first book and was published by Houghton Mifflin.

In addition to the title novella, set in Short Hills, New Jersey, Goodbye, Columbus contains the five short stories "The Conversion of the Jews", "Defender of the Faith", "Epstein", "You Can't Tell a Man by the Song He Sings", and "Eli, the Fanatic". Each story deals with the concerns of second and third-generation assimilated American Jews as they leave the ethnic ghettos of their parents and grandparents and go on to college, to white-collar professions, and to  life in the suburbs.

The book was a critical success for Roth and won the 1960 U.S. National Book Award for Fiction. The book was not without controversy, as people within the Jewish community took issue with Roth's less than flattering portrayal of some characters. The short story Defender of the Faith, about a Jewish sergeant who is exploited by three shirking, coreligionist draftees, drew particular ire.  When Roth in 1962 appeared on a panel alongside the distinguished black novelist Ralph Ellison to discuss minority representation in literature, the questions directed at him became denunciations.  Many accused Roth of being a self-hating Jew, a label that stuck with him for years.

The title novella was made into the 1969 film Goodbye, Columbus, starring Ali MacGraw and Richard Benjamin.

Roth's own retrospective reckoning

Roth wrote in the preface to the book's 30th anniversary edition: "With clarity and with crudeness, and a great deal of exuberance, the embryonic writer who was me wrote these stories in his early 20s, while he was a graduate student at the University of Chicago, a soldier stationed in New Jersey and Washington, and a novice English instructor back at Chicago following his Army discharge...In the beginning it  amazed him that any literate audience could seriously be interested in his story of tribal secrets, in what he knew, as a child of his neighborhood, about the rites and taboos of his clan—about their aversions, their aspirations, their fears of deviance and defection, their embarrassments and ideas of success."

The novella
The title story of the collection, Goodbye, Columbus, is an irreverent look at the life of middle-class Jewish Americans, satirizing, according to one reviewer, their "complacency, parochialism, and materialism." It was controversial with reviewers, who were highly polarized in their judgments.

The story is told by the narrator, Neil Klugman, who is working in a low-paying position in the Newark Public Library. He lives with his Aunt Gladys and Uncle Max in a working-class neighborhood of Newark, New Jersey. One summer, Neil meets and falls for Brenda Patimkin, a student at Radcliffe College who is from a wealthy family living in the affluent suburb of Short Hills. Neil persuades Brenda to get a diaphragm which her mother discovers.

The title “Goodbye, Columbus” is a quote from a song that was sung by the departing seniors, including Brenda's brother, Ron, at their graduation from Ohio State University at Columbus. Ron dearly enjoys listening to a record of the song that evokes his years as a varsity athlete on a campus where sports are big.

The novella was adapted into a film of the same name in 1969.

Short stories

"The Conversion of the Jews"
This short story, which first appeared in The Paris Review (issue 18, Spring 1958) — deals with the themes of questioning religion and being violent to one another because of it.

Ozzie Freedman, a Jewish-American boy about thirteen years old, confronts his Hebrew school teacher, Rabbi Binder, with challenging questions: especially, whether it is possible that God gave the Virgin Mary a child without having intercourse. Rabbi Binder interprets Ozzie's question about the virgin birth as impertinent, though Ozzie sincerely wishes to better understand God and his faith.  When Ozzie continues to ask challenging questions, Binder slaps him on the face, accidentally bloodying Ozzie's nose. Ozzie calls Binder a bastard and, without thinking, runs to the roof of the synagogue. Once there, Ozzie threatens to jump.

The rabbi and pupils go out to watch Ozzie from the pavement and try to convince him not to leap.  Ozzie's mother arrives. Ozzie threatens to jump unless they all bow on their knees in the Christian tradition and admit that God can make a virgin birth, and furthermore, that they believe in Jesus Christ; he then admonishes all those present that they should never "hit anyone about God". He finally ends by jumping off the roof onto a glowing yellow net held by firemen.

"Defender of the Faith"
The story—originally published in The New Yorker on March 7, 1959 (online) — deals with a Jewish American army sergeant who resists the attempted manipulation of a fellow Jew to exploit their mutual ethnicity to receive special favours. The story caused consternation among Jewish readers and religious groups, as recounted in chapter five of Roth's 1988 memoir The Facts: A Novelist's Autobiography.

"Epstein"
The title character goes through a crisis, feeling at age fifty-nine that by accepting the responsibilities of business, marriage, and parenthood, he has missed out on life, and starts an affair with another woman. His wife believes he has syphilis so she wants a divorce, then he has a heart attack.

"You Can't Tell a Man by the Song He Sings"
An unnamed narrator recalls the events surrounding his meeting with Alberto Pelagutti, a troublemaker, in high school.

"Eli, the Fanatic"
The assimilated Jews of a small community express fear that their peaceful coexistence with the Gentiles will be disturbed by the establishment of an Orthodox yeshiva in their neighborhood. Lawyer Eli tries to calm things down, his wife is about to give birth and Eli is suspected to be having a nervous breakdown.

References

1959 short story collections
American short story collections
Houghton Mifflin books
Novels set in New Jersey
American novellas
National Book Award for Fiction winning works
Books by Philip Roth
Jewish American short story collections
Novels republished in the Library of America
Works originally published in The Paris Review
1959 debut works
American novels adapted into films